Gianpiero Tozzi (born 1 June 1994) is an Italian footballer who plays for Italian Serie D club Aprilia.

Biography
Born in Rome, capital of Italy, Tozzi started his career at Parma F.C. On 1 February 2013 he was signed by Foligno. In summer 2013, he left for Nocerina, along with Parma "team-mate" Carlo Crialese and Raffaele Rosato. After the club was expelled from the league, Tozzi was signed by Lamezia along with Giovanbattista Catalano on 23 January 2014.

In summer 2014 Tozzi left for Serie D club Aprilia.

References

External links
 AIC profile (data by football.it) 

Italian footballers
Parma Calcio 1913 players
A.S.D. Città di Foligno 1928 players
A.S.G. Nocerina players
Vigor Lamezia players
Serie C players
Association football midfielders
Footballers from Rome
1994 births
Living people